Cypripedium montanum is a member of the orchid genus Cypripedium. It is commonly known as large lady's slipper, mountain lady's slipper, white lady's slipper as well as moccasin flower. This latter is also the common name of Cypripedium acaule.

Description
The stem has alternating, plicate leaves. Atop the stem sits one to three large flowers. The sepals and petals tend to be maroon-brown while the pouch is white. This species is a close ally of Cypripedium parviflorum, so they appear to be very similar with the main difference being pouch color.

Range
Cypripedium montanum can be found in the northwestern United States and western Canada. It is reported from California, Oregon, Washington, Idaho, Montana, Wyoming, Saskatchewan, Alberta, British Columbia and Alaska. It is usually found at high elevation in open woods and subalpine slopes. Meriwether Lewis noted this species during his expedition while in Western Montana near Lolo Creek.

References

 Phillip Cribb & Peter Green (1997). The Genus Cypripedium (a botanical monograph). Kew Royal Botanic Gardens, Timber Press 

montanum
Orchids of Canada
Orchids of the United States
Plants described in 1840